Go Pala was successor and son of Indra Pala and his queen Rajya Devi, of Pala Dynasty of Kamarupa Kingdom, who ruled for the period 990-1015 A.D.

The following description is taken from the copper plate grant of Dharma Pala:

"In his (Brahma Pala's) family there was a king called Go Pala who was skilled in politics and had deep regard for religion. His valour burnt the enemies as fire burns a forest. That famous and spirited king had a wife of the name of Nayana of noble reputation. She bore a son the illustrious Harsha Pala."

References

Further reading
   
 
 
 
 
 
 
 
 
 
 
 
 

Pala dynasty (Kamarupa)
10th-century Indian monarchs